Bitlis Province is a province of eastern Turkey, located to the west of Lake Van. The province is considered part of Western Armenia by Armenians. The province is considered part of Turkish Kurdistan and has a Kurdish majority. The current Governor of the province is Oktay Çağatay.

Demographics

History
The province was part of Moxoene of the Kingdom of Armenia. Before the Armenian genocide, the area was part of the Six Armenian Vilayets. 

The administrative center was the town of Bitlis which was called Bagesh, in old Armenian sources.

In 1927 the office of the Inspector General was created, which governed with martial law. The Bitlis province was included in the first Inspectorate General (Umumi Müfettişlik, UM) over which the Inspector General ruled. The UM span over the provinces of Hakkâri, Siirt, Van, Mardin, Bitlis, Sanlıurfa, Elaziğ and Diyarbakır. The Inspectorate General was dissolved in 1952 during the Government of the Democrat Party.

Districts

Bitlis Province is divided into 7 districts (the capital district is in bold):
 Adilcevaz
 Ahlat
 Bitlis
 Güroymak
 Hizan
 Mutki
 Tatvan

Economy

As of 1920, the province was producing small amounts of iron, copper, lead, and sulphur. Even smaller amounts of gold and silver were found in the areas of Sairt and Khairwan. Salt made up the largest mineral industry in the province, so much that it was exported to surrounding provinces. The salt was produced in pans, using evaporation, and taking 8 to 10 days to mature. The technique and trade was mainly run by local Kurds.

Attractions
 Nemrut (volcano)
 Lake Nemrut

References

External links 

 Pictures of the city of Bitlis, the capital of Bitlis province - and of nearby Siirt
 Bitlis Weather Forecast Information
 The Armenian History and Presence in Bitlis

 
Turkish Kurdistan